Chile–Vietnam relations refers to the current and historical relations between Chile and Vietnam. Chile has an embassy in Hanoi and a consulate in Hồ Chí Minh City; whilst Vietnam has an embassy in Santiago. The two countries are both members of Asia-Pacific Economic Cooperation and are main parties signing the Trans-Pacific Partnership.

History
Chile was the second country in Latin America and the first in South America to acknowledge the State of Vietnam in 1950.

Chile and Vietnam first established relationship at 1972, back then when there were two Vietnams taking place in the Vietnam War. However, after Augusto Pinochet staged a coup d'état a year later and following North Vietnam's victory in 1975 the relationship became strained.  Pinochet, an anti-communist, was hostile to the newly established communist government of Vietnam and there was no official relationship during the 1980s between the right-wing anti-communist Chilean junta and Communist Vietnam.  At the same time, Vietnam's planned economy faltered while Chile witnessed a significant economic growth which was praised as "Miracle of Chile".

Economic relations

Throughout the late 1980s both countries witnessed big changes. Vietnam began their economic reform in 1986 while Chile transferred from junta to democracy in 1990. The relationship thawed. Chile has become one of Latin America's largest economic investors to Vietnam. , Vietnam is Chile's second largest trading partner in the ASEAN.

The two countries have been deepening their trade and economic relations which are now much deeper than the usual trade relations between two countries, as praised by Ambassador of Chile to Vietnam Claudio de Negri.

Both nations signed a Free-Trade Agreement in 2014 and was re-affirmed by President Michelle Bachelet in her visit to Vietnam at 2017.

References

External links
Embassy of Chile in the Socialist Republic of Vietnam 
Embassy of the Socialist Republic of Vietnam in Chile

 
Vietnam
Bilateral relations of Vietnam